Mary District is a district of Mary Province in Turkmenistan. The administrative center of the district is the town of Mary.

Districts of Turkmenistan
Mary Region